2747 Český Krumlov, provisional designation , is a carbonaceous asteroid and slow rotator from the outer regions of the asteroid belt, approximately 22 kilometers in diameter. It was discovered by Czech astronomer Antonín Mrkos at Kleť Observatory on 19 February 1980, and named for the Czech town of Český Krumlov.

Orbit and classification 

Český Krumlov belongs to the Hygiea family. It orbits the Sun in the outer main-belt at a distance of 2.7–3.5 AU once every 5 years and 5 months (1,991 days). Its orbit has an eccentricity of 0.13 and an inclination of 6° with respect to the ecliptic.

The body's observation arc begins four weeks later with a precovery taken at Palomar Observatory, 27 years prior to its official discovery observation at Klet Observatory.

Physical characteristics 

Český Krumlov has been characterized as an X-type and carbonaceous C-type asteroid.

Slow rotator 

In October 2010, a rotational lightcurve of Český Krumlov was obtained from photometric observations by astronomers at the Palomar Transient Factory in California. Lightcurve analysis gave a rotation period of 438.7098 hours with a brightness variation of 0.63 magnitude. This makes it a very slow rotator.

Diameter and albedo 

According to the surveys carried out by the Infrared Astronomical Satellite IRAS, the Japanese Akari satellite, and NASA's Wide-field Infrared Survey Explorer with its subsequent NEOWISE mission, Český Krumlov measures between 22.51 and 36.33 kilometers in diameter and its surface has an albedo between 0.028 and 0.06.

The Collaborative Asteroid Lightcurve Link assumes a standard albedo for carbonaceous asteroids of 0.057 and calculates a diameter of 20.62 kilometers with an absolute magnitude of 12.16.

Naming 

This minor planet was named after the historic Czech town of Český Krumlov, near to the location of the discovering Kleť Observatory. The approved naming citation was published by the Minor Planet Center on 29 November 1993.

References

External links 
 Asteroid Lightcurve Database (LCDB), query form (info )
 Dictionary of Minor Planet Names, Google books
 Asteroids and comets rotation curves, CdR – Observatoire de Genève, Raoul Behrend
 Discovery Circumstances: Numbered Minor Planets (1)-(5000) – Minor Planet Center
 
 

002747
Discoveries by Antonín Mrkos
Named minor planets
002747
19800219